Edith Kiertzner Heath (May 24, 1911  – December 27, 2005) was an American studio potter and founder of Heath Ceramics. The company, well known for its mid-century modern ceramic tableware, including "Heathware," and architectural tiles, is still operating in Sausalito, California, after being founded in 1948.

Life and education
Kiertzner was born on May 24, 1911, in Ida Grove, Iowa, forty miles east of Sioux City, Iowa, to Danish immigrants Niels and Karoline Kiertzner. In 1931, Kiertzner enrolled at the Chicago Normal School, later renamed Chicago Teachers College, and graduated in 1934. She enrolled part-time at the Art Institute of Chicago after graduation taking her first ceramic course. She also took classes from László Moholy-Nagy at his Chicago School of Design. In 1938, Edith married Brian Heath.

Developing ceramics

Relocating to San Francisco, Edith accepted a position  as an art teacher at the Presidio Hill School and audited classes at the California School of Fine Arts. She developed a clay body in these classes which she adapted many times for her production work. Not being able to have as much access to the pottery equipment as she wished, Edith pursued her ceramic interests on her own converting a treadle sewing machine into a pottery wheel.

In 1943, she studied eutectics, the science of mixing various metals with clay to create specific properties, with Willard Kahn through the University of California extension courses. She experimented with mixing various metals into the clay mixture to achieve different properties. She used native clay, experimenting with various California clays before settling on clay from the Sierra mountains because this was able to withstand very high heat. Heath's continued experimentation led to her becoming an expert in how different clay types affected aesthetic qualities of her wares. She also developed custom glazes, including the speckle glaze that was innovative at the time.

In 1944, her first major show was at the California Palace of the Legion of Honor. She also participated in the Syracuse Ceramic Nationals.

Heath ceramics

A buyer from San Francisco retailer Gumps approached Edith to supply their store with her high quality hand-thrown pottery using the company's pottery studio.  She accepted the opportunity, while continuing to work in her own studio. Major retailers began to order tableware, which required Heath to develop ways to manufacture her pieces from her design rather than create them by hand. In 1948, she opened Heath Ceramics in Sausalito, California. By 1949, Heath was producing 100,000 pieces a year.

Heath Ceramics was purchased by Robin Petravic and Catherine Bailey in 2003. Edith Heath died on December 27, 2005, at her home in Tiburon, California.

Tableware

Edith Heath's "Coupe" line remains in demand and has been in constant production since 1948, with periodic changes to the texture and color of the glazes.  Other Heath pottery lines include "Rim," designed in 1960, and "Plaza," designed in the 1980s.
"Rim", as its name implies, had an unglazed outer rim. It was favored by restaurants because the rim made the pieces easy to carry and the pieces stacked securely.

Architectural tile

The Pasadena Art Museum, now the Norton Simon Museum, in Pasadena, California, and designed by Pasadena architects Thornton Ladd and John Kelsey of the firm 'Ladd + Kelsey' used Heath architectural tiles. The distinctive and modern curvilinear exterior facade is faced in 115,000 glazed tiles, in varying brown tones with an undulating surface, made by Edith Heath. They are part of the backdrop many see when viewing the New Year's Rose Parade. Heath was awarded the American Institute of Architects Industrial Arts Medal for this work. It was the first time the medal had been given to a non-architect. She also collaborated with architects Eero Saarinen, Alexander Girard, Kevin Roche, and William Pereira.

Other
Interested in making use of small clay leftovers and space in the kiln, Heath created a line of ceramic buttons. Although colorful, the buttons did not work well and they were discontinued.

Exhibits and media

 In 2019 the public television station KCET produced a biographical documentary about Edith Heath's life and work, entitled Heath Ceramics: The Making of a California Classic.  The film was directed by Chris Metzler and Quinn Costello, and explored the history and influence of Edith Heath, including her continuing legacy at Heath Ceramics today. The film was honored by the LA Press Club at the 2019 National Arts and Entertainment Awards where the film won first-place recognition in the Documentary or Special Program Feature (over 30 minutes) category.
 Edith Heath: Tabletop Modernist, Pasadena Museum of California Art, May 31-September 20, 2009
 Edith Heath: A Life in Clay, Oakland Museum of California, January 29, 2022–October 30, 2022

Awards
 AIA Industrial Arts Medal award from the American Institute of Architects, 1971

References

Further reading
 Klausner, Amos. Heath Ceramics, The Complexity of Simplicity. Chronicle Books LLC, San Francisco (2006)

External links
Heath Ceramics
The Edith and Brian Heath Archives at the University of California, Berkeley School of Environmental Design
KCET.org video: Heath Ceramics - The Making of a California Classic
KCET.org article: Edith Heath: A Rebellion in Clay

American ceramists
American potters
American industrial designers
Women potters
1911 births
2005 deaths
California people in design
American women ceramists
Dinnerware designers
Artists from the San Francisco Bay Area
People from Tiburon, California
People from Sausalito, California
Modernist architecture in California
Ceramics manufacturers of the United States
20th-century American artists
20th-century ceramists
20th-century American women artists
21st-century American women